Lincoln Withers (born 7 May 1980) is an Australian former professional rugby league footballer who last played for Hull Kingston Rovers in the Super League.

Withers also played for Crusaders and in the NRL for the Canberra Raiders, St George Illawarra Dragons and the Wests Tigers.

Background
Withers was born in Canberra, Australian Capital TerritoryLincoln Withers junior rugby league club was Woden Western Rams.

Playing career
While attending Erindale College in the ACT, Withers was selected to play with the Australian Schoolboys rugby league team in 1997.

Withers made his first grade debut for Canberra against Brisbane in Round 14 2000.

In 2001, Withers joined Wests and played with them up until the end of 2003.  In 2004, Withers joined St George Illawarra spending 1 season at the club before returning to Canberra becoming a regular starter with the team before departing at the end of 2008.

Withers signed with the Super League side Crusaders for 2009 after being released from the final year of his contract at Canberra.

Withers went on to play with the Crusaders and Hull KR in the Super League.  Withers retired from playing professionally at the end of 2013.  Withers was last playing for the Woden Valley Rams in the Canberra Rugby League Competition.

Career highlights
 First Grade Debut: 2000 - Round 14, Canberra vs Brisbane Broncos at Canberra Stadium, 8 May

References

External links
Lincoln Withers Official Player Profile

1981 births
Living people
Australian expatriate sportspeople in England
Australian rugby league players
Canberra Raiders players
Crusaders Rugby League players
Exiles rugby league team players
Hull Kingston Rovers players
Prime Minister's XIII players
Rugby league halfbacks
Rugby league hookers
Rugby league players from Canberra
St. George Illawarra Dragons players
Wests Tigers players